José Melchor Baltasar Gaspar Nebra Blasco (January 6, 1702 – July 11, 1768) was a Spanish composer. His work combines Spanish traditions with the Italian style of his day.

Biography 
José de Nebra was born in Calatayud and was taught by his father, José Antonio Nebra Mezquita (1672–1748), organist and master of choirboys at the Cathedral of Cuenca from 1711 until 1729. Two brothers were also musicians: Francisco Javier Nebra Blasco (1705–1741), organist of La Seo in Zaragoza until he moved to Cuenca in 1729, then succeeded by his brother Joaquín Ignacio Nebra Blasco (1709–1782) till his death. He died in Madrid.

More than 170 works by Nebra survive: masses, psalms, litanies, a Stabat Mater, a Salve Regina, cantatas, villancicos, and around thirty keyboard works. But his significance is as the leading late-Baroque composer of Spanish opera and zarzuela.

Works

Sacred works
 Aromática rosa Americana
 Miserere
 Para un triunfo que el orbe
 Requiem for Queen Barbara of Braganza
 Rompan los vagos espacios
 Salve regina
 Cantata: Entre candidos bellos

Operas
 Amor aumenta el valor (collective work, 1st act only), Lisbon 1728
 Venus y Adonis, 1729
 Más gloria es triunfar de sí.  Adriano in Syria, 1737
 No todo indicio es verdad. Alexander in Asia, 1744
 Antes que zelos y amor, la piedad llama al valor. Achilles in Troy 1747

Zarzuelas
 Las proezas de Esplandián y el valor deshace encantos, 1729
 Amor, ventura y valor logran el triunfo mayor, 1739
 Viento es la dicha de amor, 1743
 Donde hay violencia, no hay culpa, 1744
 Vendado es Amor, no es ciego, 1744
 Cautelas contra cautelas y el rapto de Ganimedes, 1745
 La colonia de Diana, 1745
 Para obsequio a la deydad, nunca es culto la crueldad. Iphigenia en Tracia (Thrace), 1747 
 No hay perjurio sin castigo, 1747

Notable performances
The composer's 250th anniversary in 2018 saw the programming of some of his works, for example at Musica Antigua Aranjuez, the early music festival at Aranjuez. A performance of the opera Venus y Adonis has been scheduled for 2019 by the Centro Nacional de Difusión Musical.

Selected recordings
1996 - Viento es la dicha de amor (zarzuela). Ensemble Baroque de Limoges, dir. Christophe Coin. Naïve
2001 – Miserere. Al Ayre Español.  Deutsche Harmonia Mundi 
 Sonata, op. 1 no. 4 for harpsichord, performed by Janine Johnson
2005 – La Cantada Española en América. Al Ayre Español. Harmonia Mundi
2006 - Vispera de Confesores. La Grande Chapelle, dir. Àngel Recasens. Lauda Musica
2006 - Arias de Zarzuelas. María Bayo, Al Ayre Español, dir. Eduardo López Banzo. Harmonia Mundi
2010 – Amor aumenta el valor (opera). Los Músicos de Su Alteza. Alpha
2011 -  Cantatas. Esta Dulzura Amable. Al Ayre Español, dir. Eduardo López Banzo. Challenge Classics
2011 - Principio des Maitines de Navidad; Responsorium I, Nocturno 1, Nativitatis Domini. "Madrid 1752, Madrid Barroco, dir. Grover Wilkins. Dorian
2011 - Iphigenia en Tracia (zarzuela). El concierto español, dir. Emilio Moreno. Glossa
2019 - Requiem. La Madrileña - Coro Victoria - Schola Antiqua, dir. José Antonio Montaño. Pan Classics
2020 - Vendado es Amor, no es ciego (zarzuela). Los elementos, dir.Alberto Miguélez Rouco. Glossa

References

External links
 
 Música Colonial Management Site Includes manuscripts of works by Nebra
  Instituto Fernando el Catolico for published editions

1702 births
1768 deaths
18th-century classical composers
18th-century male musicians
18th-century Spanish musicians
Male opera composers
People from Calatayud
Spanish Baroque composers
Spanish male classical composers
Spanish opera composers